Gopinath Mohanty  (1914–1991), winner of the Jnanpith award, and the first winner of the National Sahitya Akademi Award in 1955 – for his novel, Amrutara Santana – was a prolific Odia writer of the mid-twentieth century. Satya Prakash Mohanty, professor of English, Cornell University says: "In my opinion, Gopinath Mohanty is the most important Indian novelist in the second half of the twentieth century."

Career
Mohanty joined the Odisha Administrative Service in 1938 and retired in 1969. He was invited by Professor Prabhat Nalini Das, then head of the English department at Utkal University as University Grants Commission, UGC Distinguished Visiting Professor and writer-in-residence for two years at the English department, Utkal University, in the late 1970s.

In 1986, he joined San Jose State University in the United States as an adjunct professor of Social Sciences. He died at San Jose, California on 20 August 1991.

Novels
Gopinath's first novel, Mana Gahirara Chasa, was published in 1940, which was followed by Dadi Budha (1944), Paraja (1945) and Amrutara Santana (1947). His literary output was prolific. He wrote twenty-four novels, ten collections of short stories, three plays, two biographies, two volumes of critical essays, and five books on the languages of the Kandha, Gadaba and Saora tribes of Odisha. He translated Tolstoy's War and Peace (Yuddh O Shanti), in three volumes, 1985–86), and Rabindranath Tagore's Jogajog, (1965), into Odia.

Dadi Budha (The Ancestor) (1944) is his first novel on the tribal community and it offers a realistic portrait of life and tradition of the tribal people of the mountainous region surrounded by thick forest. It is a seminal novel in Tribal Literature and corresponds to Chinua Achebe's classic tale of Colonial invasion of tribal culture Things fall Apart and foregrounds almost the same theme – the impact of modernity and disintegration of tribal society.

 Paraja  (1945) is a moving narrative based on the life of a tribal community. It is the tale of one's attachment to land, the soil of one's ancestors. Sitakant Mahapatra describes the novel as "the story of shattered dreams". The novel also implicitly portrays the impact of colonial rule on Odishan tribals.

 Amrutara Santana  (1949), the first novel to receive the Central Sahitya Akademi Award (1955), is centered round the life of the Kandhas, another tribe in the southern parts of Odisha.

Short stories
In the post-Independence era Odia fiction assumed a new direction. The trend which Fakir Mohan Senapati had started developed after the 1950s. Gopinath Mohanty, Surendra Mohanty and Manoj Das are considered the three literary jewels of this period. They were pioneers of a new trend, namely, that of developing or projecting the "individual as protagonist" in Odia fiction. Another of Gopinath's stories, 'Pimpudi' has had great influence. It is the story of a forest officer checking rice smuggling to Madras.

English translations
Five of Gopinath's novels, along with a number of short stories, have been translated into English. It is extremely difficult to render in English the nuances of Gopinath Mohanty's language. However, translators have attempted to convey the richness and complexity of the original texts to readers unfamiliar with Odia.

Awards
Mohanty received the Visuva Milan citation in 1950. He won the first central Sahitya Akademi Award in 1955 for his novel, Amrutara Santana.. It was the first Sahitya Akademi Award ever given to a creative literary work in any language or any genre. The Jnanpith Award was conferred on him in 1973 for his epic Mati Matala (The Fertile Soil). He was awarded the Soviet Land Nehru Award in 1970, for his Odia Translation of Gorky's work, a D.Litt. by Sambalpur University in 1976 and a distinguished visiting professorship for creative writing by the U.G.C. at the Department of English, Utkal University in 1976. In 1981, the government of India conferred the Padma Bhushan on him in recognition of his distinguished contribution to literature. He was an Emeritus Fellow of the Government of India for creative writing.

Bibliography

See also
 List of Indian writers
 List of Sahitya Akademi Award winners for Odia
 Kanhu Charan Mohanty

References

Further reading

1914 births
1991 deaths
People from Cuttack district
Recipients of the Padma Bhushan in literature & education
Recipients of the Sahitya Akademi Award in Odia
Indian male novelists
Indian male short story writers
Academic staff of Utkal University
Recipients of the Jnanpith Award
Odia-language writers
Odia novelists
Ravenshaw University alumni
Patna University alumni
20th-century Indian novelists
20th-century Indian short story writers
Novelists from Odisha
20th-century Indian male writers
Indian civil servants
San Jose State University faculty